Verruculopsis is a genus of saxicolous (rock-dwelling), crustose lichens in the family Verrucariaceae. It was circumscribed in 2007 by Cécile Gueidan, Pere Navarro-Rosinés, and Claude Roux, with Verruculopsis poeltiana assigned as the type species.

Species
Verruculopsis beltraminiana 
Verruculopsis flavescentaria 
Verruculopsis irrubescentis 
Verruculopsis lecideoides 
Verruculopsis poeltiana

References

Verrucariales
Eurotiomycetes genera
Lichen genera
Taxa described in 2007
Taxa named by Cécile Gueidan
Taxa named by Claude Roux